The Royal Saxon 24th Reserve Division (Kgl. Sächsische 24. Reserve-Division) was a unit of the Imperial German Army in World War I.  The division was formed on mobilization of the German Army in August 1914 as part of the XII (Royal Saxon) Reserve Corps.  The division was disbanded in 1919 during the demobilization of the German Army after World War I.  The division was raised in the Kingdom of Saxony.

Combat chronicle

The 24th Reserve Division fought on the Western Front, participating in the opening German offensive which led to the Allied Great Retreat and ended with the First Battle of the Marne.  Thereafter, the division remained in the line in the Champagne region through the end of 1914 and until July 1916, and fought in the Second Battle of Champagne in the autumn of 1915.  In late July 1916, the division entered the Battle of the Somme, fighting there with a few respites until November 1916 and then returning to positional warfare in the trenchlines.  It was sent to the Eastern Front at the end of April 1917, and fought against the Kerensky Offensive, the last major Russian offensive of the war. The division returned to the Western Front in late October/early November and saw action in the last phases of the Battle of Passchendaele.  The division then participated in the 1918 German spring offensive and the subsequent Allied offensives and counteroffensives, including the Hundred Days Offensive.  Allied intelligence rated the division as third class.

Order of battle on mobilization

The order of battle of the 24th Reserve Division on mobilization was as follows:

47. Reserve-Infanterie-Brigade
Kgl. Sächs. Reserve-Infanterie-Regiment Nr. 104
Kgl. Sächs. Reserve-Infanterie-Regiment Nr. 106
Kgl. Sächs. Reserve-Jäger-Bataillon Nr. 13
48. Reserve-Infanterie-Brigade
Kgl. Sächs. Reserve-Infanterie-Regiment Nr. 107
Kgl. Sächs. Reserve-Infanterie-Regiment Nr. 133
Kgl. Sächs. Reserve-Ulanen-Regiment
Kgl. Sächs. Reserve-Feldartillerie-Regiment Nr. 24
1.Kompanie/Kgl. Sächs. Reserve-Pionier-Bataillon Nr. 12
2.Kompanie/Kgl. Sächs. Reserve-Pionier-Bataillon Nr. 12

Order of battle on March 21, 1918

The 24th Reserve Division was triangularized in March 1915. Over the course of the war, other changes took place, including the formation of artillery and signals commands and a pioneer battalion.  The order of battle on March 21, 1918, was as follows:

48. Reserve-Infanterie-Brigade
Kgl. Sächs. Reserve-Infanterie-Regiment Nr. 104
Kgl. Sächs. Reserve-Infanterie-Regiment Nr. 107
Kgl. Sächs. Reserve-Infanterie-Regiment Nr. 133
Maschinengewehr-Scharfschützen-Abteilung Nr. 50
3.Eskadron/Kgl. Sächs. Reserve-Husaren-Regiment
Kgl. Sächs. Artillerie-Kommandeur 120
Kgl. Sächs. Reserve-Feldartillerie-Regiment Nr. 68
I.Bataillon/Kgl. Bayer. 1. Fußartillerie-Regiment
Kgl. Sächs. Stab Pionier-Bataillon Nr. 324
1.Kompanie/Kgl. Sächs. Reserve-Pionier-Bataillon Nr. 12
6.Kompanie/Kgl. Sächs. Reserve-Pionier-Bataillon Nr. 12
Kgl. Sächs. Minenwerfer-Kompanie Nr. 224
Kgl. Sächs. Divisions-Nachrichten-Kommandeur 424

References
 24. Reserve-Division (Chronik 1914/1918) - Der erste Weltkrieg
 Hermann Cron et al., Ruhmeshalle unserer alten Armee (Berlin, 1935)
 Hermann Cron, Geschichte des deutschen Heeres im Weltkriege 1914-1918 (Berlin, 1937)
 Günter Wegner, Stellenbesetzung der deutschen Heere 1815-1939. (Biblio Verlag, Osnabrück, 1993), Bd. 1
 Histories of Two Hundred and Fifty-One Divisions of the German Army which Participated in the War (1914-1918), compiled from records of Intelligence section of the General Staff, American Expeditionary Forces, at General Headquarters, Chaumont, France 1919 (1920)

Notes

Infantry divisions of Germany in World War I
Military units and formations established in 1914
Military units and formations disestablished in 1919
1914 establishments in Germany